The Carrot Rock skink (Spondylurus macleani) is a species of skink found on Carrot Rock in the British Virgin Islands.

References

Spondylurus
Reptiles described in 2000
Reptiles of the Caribbean
Endemic fauna of the Caribbean